Nasir Hameed (born April 4, 1969) is a Pakistani-born Hong Kong cricketer who has appeared once at One Day International level, against Pakistan in the 2004 Asia Cup. He opened the batting with Tim Smart, but was dismissed for 0.

Notes

References
 
 

1969 births
Living people
Hong Kong cricketers
Hong Kong One Day International cricketers
Pakistani emigrants to Hong Kong
Cricketers from Rawalpindi
Sportspeople of Pakistani descent
Wicket-keepers